Revie is a surname and given name. Notable people with the name include:

surname
Don Revie (1927–1989), British football player and manager
Gillian Revie, British ballerina
Jack Revie (fl. 1930), Australian football coach
Jimmy Revie (born 1947), British boxer

given name
Revie Sorey (born 1953) American football player